Nicola Antonio Spinelli, C.R. (1583 – 23 September 1634) was a Roman Catholic prelate who served as Bishop of Alessano (1612–1634).

Biography
Nicola Antonio Spinelli was born in 1583 in Naples, Italy and ordained a priest in the Congregation of Clerics Regular of the Divine Providence. On 16 July 1612, he was appointed during the papacy of Pope Paul V as Bishop of Alessano. On 1 August 1612, he was consecrated bishop by Bonifazio Caetani, Bishop of Cassano all'Jonio, with Giovanni Battista del Tufo, Bishop Emeritus of Acerra, and Domingo de Oña, Bishop of Gaeta, serving as co-consecrators. He served as Bishop of Alessano until his death on 23 September 1634.

References

External links and additional sources
 (for Chronology of Bishops) 
 (for Chronology of Bishops) 

17th-century Italian Roman Catholic bishops
1583 births
1634 deaths
Bishops appointed by Pope Paul V
Clergy from Naples
Theatine bishops